The 265th Air Defense Artillery Regiment is an air defense artillery regiment in the Florida Army National Guard. The unit was formed 19 October 1923 in the Florida National Guard as the 1st Separate Battalion, Coast Artillery Corps. It was reorganized and redesignated as the 265th Coast Artillery Regiment (CA) (Harbor Defense) (HD) in 1929. The 265th was activated for World War II and served in the harbor defenses of Galveston, Texas, Los Angeles, California, Key West, Florida, Sandy Hook, New Jersey, and Alaska until broken up into battalions in July 1944. The unit lineage was carried by two antiaircraft battalions organized in 1946, one of which was federalized in Florida during the Korean War. Consolidated with other units in 1959 as the 265th Artillery; reorganized in 1987 as the 265th Air Defense Artillery.

Lineage

Interwar period

The 265th Coast Artillery Battalion was constituted in the National Guard in 1924 as a three-battery battalion, allotted to the state of Florida, and assigned to the Harbor Defenses of Pensacola. The 1st Separate Battalion, Coast Artillery, was organized and federally recognized 14 November 1923 in the Florida National Guard with headquarters at Jacksonville, and was redesignated on 4 April 1924 as the 1st Separate Battalion, Coast Artillery Corps. The Battalion was redesignated on 22 July 1925 as the 265th Coast Artillery Battalion. The battalion was expanded to four batteries in February 1928, and on 20 November 1929, was expanded and reorganized as a five-battery, two-battalion regiment, as the 265th Coast Artillery Regiment. In October 1939, a sixth firing battery and a searchlight battery were organized. The regiment's designated mobilization training station was Fort Barrancas, Florida. The regiment conducted annual summer training most years at Key West Barracks, Florida, but also sometimes at Fort Barrancas, or Fort Monroe, Virginia.

In September 1926, September 1928, and September 1935, various elements of the regiment were called up to perform hurricane relief duty in South Florida. From July 1929 to June 1930, the regiment assisted with the Mediterranean fruit fly quarantine. From February to May 1935, the 2nd Battalion of the regiment was used for riot control in connection with a Veterans Works Project site. In March 1936, Battery C was used for guard and security duties when President Franklin D. Roosevelt visited Winter Park and Port Everglades, Florida.

World War II

The regiment was inducted into federal service on 6 January 1941 at home stations. It moved to Fort Crockett, Texas, in the Harbor Defenses (HD) of Galveston, Texas 15 January 1941. It operated these defenses alongside the Regular Army's 20th Coast Artillery Regiment. In December 1941, the 2nd Battalion transferred to the HD of Los Angeles, California, where it was stationed until April 1942m when the regiment was ordered to Key West, Florida to man Fort Taylor in the HD of Key West, arriving 18 through 23 April 1942. The regiment operated the HD of Key West and various outposts in the Florida Keys and southern Florida until 21 December 1942, when movement to Fort Jackson, South Carolina began, lasting until 23 January 1943. On 16 February 1943, the 265th CA departed Fort Jackson for Fort Hancock, New Jersey in the HD of Sandy Hook. There, the regiment helped to operate the HD of Sandy Hook and the HD of Southern New York until 19 June 1943, when it prepared for overseas deployment.

On 11 January 1944, the 265th CA departed New York for Fort Lawton, Washington, and deployment to Alaska, departing via the Seattle Port of Embarkation and arriving at Fort Greely in the HD of Kodiak, Alaska 24 January 1944. The 1st Battalion was transferred to Amchitka, while the 2nd Battalion went to Adak, both in the Aleutian Islands.

On 31 July 1944, the 265th Coast Artillery was inactivated and its elements redesignated. The Headquarters and Headquarters Battery (HHB) was disbanded. The 1st Battalion was redesignated the 277th Coast Artillery Battalion (155-mm Gun) (Separate) at Amchitka; the 2nd Battalion became the 278th Coast Artillery Battalion (155-mm Gun) (Separate) at Adak; and the 3rd Battalion, the  279th Coast Artillery Battalion (155-mm Gun) (Separate), at Shemya. The three battalions remained in the Aleutians through the end of the war, and were moved back to the United States via Seattle and inactivated in November 1945.

Regiment reconstituted 25 August 1945 in the Florida National Guard. Headquarters and 1st Battalion, 265th Coast Artillery, reorganized and federally recognized 5 December 1946 as the 692nd Antiaircraft Artillery Automatic Weapons Battalion, an element of the 48th Infantry Division (later designated as the 48th Armored Division), with headquarters at Jacksonville. Redesignated 1 February 1949 as the 148th Antiaircraft Artillery Battalion.

2nd Battalion reorganized and federally recognized 17 December 1946 as the 712th Antiaircraft Artillery Gun Battalion with headquarters at Miami. Ordered into active federal service 1 May 1951 during the Korean War at home stations; released 30 April 1953 from active federal service and reverted to state control. Location of headquarters changed 22 June 1953 to Sarasota. Redesignated 1 October 1953 as the 712th Antiaircraft Artillery Battalion. (Headquarters Battery reorganized and federally recognized 15 September 1946 at Jacksonville as Headquarters and Headquarters Battery (HHB), 227th Antiaircraft Artillery Group; hereafter, separate lineage.) 148th and 712th Antiaircraft Artillery Battalions consolidated 15 April 1959 and consolidated unit reorganized and redesignated as the 265th Artillery, a parent regiment under the Combat Arms Regimental System, to consist of the 1st Automatic Weapons Battalion and the 2nd Howitzer Battalion. Reorganized 15 February 1963 to consist of the 1st and 2nd Automatic Weapons Battalions and the 16th and 17th Detachments. Reorganized 20 January 1968 to consist of the 1st Battalion.

The 1st Battalion (Automatic Weapons) (Self-Propelled) was reorganized 1 October 1987 into the 1st and 3rd Battalions (Chaparral) with the HHB and Battery C forming HHB and Battery A of the 3rd Battalion. Withdrawn from the Combat Arms Regimental System 1 October 1987 and reorganized under the United States Army Regimental System with headquarters at Palatka, Florida.

Campaign streamers
World War II
 Asiatic–Pacific theater without inscription

Coat of arms

Motto
Home and Country

Symbolism
The colors scarlet and yellow are used for artillery. The unit’s service in Alaska during World War II is denoted by the bezent, symbol for gold, and the four-pointed polar star. The diagonal stripe with the nebuly edges, heraldic symbol for clouds, bearing a lightning flash, signifies the Air Defense Artillery mission. The barry wavy rounded alludes to water and refers to the regiment’s former Coast Artillery service. Additionally, it indicates the organization’s location in Florida and refers to the legendary "Fountain of Youth" sought by Ponce de Leon, the discoverer of Florida. The alligator crest also represents the state of Florida.

Distinctive Insignia
The distinctive unit insignia is the shield and motto of the coat of arms.

See also
 Escambia Rifles, a battery of the 265th Coast Artillery from 1936 - 1944.
 Seacoast defense in the United States
 United States Army Coast Artillery Corps
 Harbor Defense Command

References

Further reading

External links
 Coast Defense Study Group website

United States Army Coast Artillery Corps
Military units and formations in Florida
Military units and formations in Texas
Military units and formations in Alaska
Military units and formations established in 1923
Military units and formations disestablished in 1944
Military units and formations established in 1946